Petros Hatzitasis (1872-1932) was a Greek chieftain from Florina who contributed to the Macedonian Struggle. 

He was born in 1872 in Florina and was an important member of the five-member National Committee of Florina founded in 1902 by Nikolaos Pyrzas.

He tried to assassinate the Bulgarian komitadji Michael Grezhov in 1904, but the latter escaped, although wounded. He cooperated with the army of Pavlos Melas and participated in the clash which cost Melas his life, in Statista. He and his team cooperated with Nikostratos Kalomenopoulos for many operations. He participated in the battle of Drosopigi near Florina, where he became a prisoner of the Ottoman authorities and was imprisoned for three years, until 1908.

External links 
 Epta Imeres, Kathimerini supplement Το μοιραίο δεκαήμερο του Παύλου Μελά

References 

1872 births
1932 deaths
People from Florina
Greek people of the Macedonian Struggle
Greek prisoners and detainees
Prisoners and detainees of the Ottoman Empire
Greek people from the Ottoman Empire